Gouffre Mirolda is a karstic cave located in the Haut-Giffre mountain range, in the commune of Samoëns, Haute-Savoie, France. It is connected to the Lucien Bouclier cave network, and has a depth of 1733 m.

The cave was discovered in 1971 by Marc Degrinis, a shepherd. The cave was measured to be 1733 m deep, making it the deepest natural cave in the world from January 2003 until July 2004, when it was passed by the cave Krubera-Voronja in Abkhazia. It is the deepest cave in France. The cave's name is derived from the forenames of the Rhodanien cavers Michel Schmidt, Roland Chenevier, and Daniel Trouilleux, who were lost in a flood in Gournier Cave in November 1976.

Description 

The highest entrance to the cave is at 2336 meters. The lowest point of the cave is at -1733 meters at the grand siphon in the gallery. The bottom of the gallery (after the second siphon) has only been explored once, leaving room for further exploration. Behind the second siphon (approximately -1620) the gallery continues for 22 meters horizontally and down 8 meters, leading to an ancient drainage system. Downstream, the gallery descends over a length of 251 meters and a vertical drop of 110 meters before coming up against the first siphon at -1733 meters. Past the siphon the gallery splits in two, the left leading up towards the ceiling and the right leading 50 meters to the fossil gallery.

See also
 List of deepest caves
 List of caves in France
 List of caves

References

Caves of France